The Constantine Sneed House, also known as Windy Hill, is a historic mansion in Brentwood, Tennessee.  It was one of four houses built by the Sneed family on the Old Smyrna Road.

History
The mansion was built circa 1825. It was built by Constantine Sneed (1790-1864), the son of James Sneed and the great-great-great-great uncle of Carly Fiorina, a veteran of the American Revolutionary War who received a land grant of 640 acres and Williamson County in 1798. One of Constantine Sneed's brothers was Reverend Joseph P. Sneed.

It is a two-story brick house, upon a fancy dressed limestone foundation, with brick on the front facade laid in Flemish bond and other facades having five course common bond.

Architectural significance
It has been listed on the National Register of Historic Places since 1988. When listed the property included the main, brick two-story house, which was the listing's one contributing building.

References

Houses on the National Register of Historic Places in Tennessee
Houses in Williamson County, Tennessee
Houses completed in 1825
National Register of Historic Places in Williamson County, Tennessee